The Rangitīkei River is one of New Zealand's longest rivers,  long.

Its headwaters are to the southeast of Lake Taupō in the Kaimanawa Ranges. The river gives its name to the surrounding Rangitikei District.

In 1897 the river flooded and all the bridges over it (Vinegar Hill, Onepuhi, Kakariki railway bridge and Bulls) were damaged or destroyed. Port of Rangitikei, at the mouth of the river was also washed away and never rebuilt. Other notable floods were in 1882, 1917, 1936, 1958, 1965 and 2004. Until 1908 a ferry linked Tangimoana to Scotts Ferry. Onepuhi, or Onepuehu, bridge was shown on the 1941 map, but missing from the 1968 and later maps.

The river is a popular leisure and recreation area for jetboating, white water rafting, kayaking and fishing, and includes public camp grounds along its banks, including Vinegar Hill, New Zealand. Its sheer vertical "paapa" (clay) cliffs (unique to this part of New Zealand) and deep canyons provide the perfect setting for adventure activities such as bungy jumps and flying fox rides. The cliffs, which display oxygen isotope stages, have been incised into the soft Quaternary, 2.6 to 1.7 million year old, marine sediments as the land has risen since the last ice age. The rise has left 19 terraces, which have been mapped.

Part of the river was used as the Anduin River in Peter Jackson's movie The Lord of the Rings: The Fellowship of the Ring.

Both rainbow and brown trout throughout the river system with fish in the upper reaches reaching trophy size (i.e. over 4.5 kg) with the average through the rest of the system being around 1.5 to 2 kg. Fish numbers are good throughout the system though there are fewer fish per kilometre in the upper reaches. This is made up for by the quality and size of the fish being larger in this section.

Springvale Suspension Bridge
The Springvale Suspension Bridge crosses the Rangitīkei River on the Taihape–Napier Road (known as the Gentle Annie). It is located on the Ngamatea Plateau in the district of Ngamahanga, 41km north–east of Taihape and 111km west of Napier. It was built to support farming which increased in the inland Patea region after World War I and the need to transport stock and wool to the port at Napier. The bridge was designed by Rangitīkei County engineer Sydney Mair and built by William Salt. Construction commenced in 1923, the bridge opened in 1925 and it was known as the Rangitīkei Bridge or Erewhon Bridge after the name of the farming block.  The name Springvale came from the nearby sheep farm. The bridge was replaced by the nearby Callender–Hamilton bridge in 1970 as it was no longer able to carry heavy trucks. As an early example of a suspension bridge with reinforced concrete towers its importance in engineering heritage was recognised by Heritage New Zealand designating it as a Category II historic site.

The bridge has a span of 61m supported by 7m high concrete towers at either end. The deck is made of wood and at 2.4m wide is a single lane.

Gallery

References

External links
Rangitikei Tourism

Rivers of Manawatū-Whanganui
Rivers of New Zealand